Staurogyne minarum is a species of plant native to Brazilian cerrado vegetation.

External links
 List of taxa in the Virtual Herbarium Of The New York Botanical Garden: Staurogyne minarum 
   List of taxa in the Embrapa Recursos Genéticos e Biotecnologia: Staurogyne minarum

minarum
Flora of Brazil